Seacombe Gardens is a suburb of Adelaide in the City of Marion, South Australia.

References

See also
List of Adelaide suburbs

Suburbs of Adelaide